The 2003 Rivers State gubernatorial election occurred on April 19, 2003. Incumbent Governor PDP's Peter Odili won election for a second term, defeating ANPP's Sergeant Awuse and two other candidates.

Peter Odili emerged winner in the PDP gubernatorial primary election. His running mate was Gabriel Toby.

Electoral system
The Governor of Rivers State is elected using the plurality voting system.

Results
A total of four candidates registered with the Independent National Electoral Commission to contest in the election. PDP Governor Peter Odili won re-election for a second term, defeating ANPP's Sergeant Awuse and two other candidates.

The total number of registered voters in the state was 2,272,238. However, only 92.93% (i.e. 2,111,625) of registered voters participated in the exercise.

References 

Rivers State gubernatorial elections
Gubernatorial election 2003
Rivers State gubernatorial election